Izzy Shne Joachim (born May 11, 2000) is a Vincentian swimmer. She competed in the 50 m freestyle and 100 m freestyle, 50 m, 100 m and 200 m breaststroke, 50 m backstroke, 50 m butterfly and 100 m individual medley events at the 2012 FINA World Swimming Championships (25 m). Joachim also competed in the 50 m and 100 m breaststroke events at the 2013 World Aquatics Championships.  She competed at the 2016 Summer Olympics in the women's 100 metre breaststroke event; her time of 1:17.37 in the heats did not qualify her for the semifinals.

References

Living people
2000 births
Saint Vincent and the Grenadines female swimmers
Swimmers at the 2015 Pan American Games
Swimmers at the 2016 Summer Olympics
Olympic swimmers of Saint Vincent and the Grenadines
Pan American Games competitors for Saint Vincent and the Grenadines